Sir Gerald Aubrey Goodman KC (6 September 1862 – 20 January 1921) was a Barbadian barrister and politician.  He also served as Attorney-General of the Straits Settlements and as a judge in Malaya. His final appointment was as Chief Justice of the Straits Settlements but he died before he could take up office.

Early life
Goodman was born in Barbados, the son of Augustus Flavius Goodman.

He was educated at Lodge School and Harrison College on the island and University College, London, before being called to the bar by the Middle Temple in 1885. He then returned to Barbados to practise.

Career in Barbados
He was appointed Solicitor-General of Barbados in 1896 (having acted in the role in 1890, 1891, and 1892) and Attorney-General of Barbados in 1907 (having acted in the role in 1891, 1898, 1900, 1901, 1902, 1903, and 1904), serving until 1913. He was a member of the Barbados House of Assembly from 1889 to 1912, the Barbados Board of Education from 1891 to 1912, and the Quarantine Board and General Board of Health from 1902 to 1912.

He was appointed a King's Counsel in 1903.

He was also a cricketer, playing two first-class matches for Barbados against Trinidad in Port of Spain in September 1893. Captaining the team and keeping wicket, he led Barbados to victory in both matches, which included the final of the Inter-Colonial Tournament for 1893–94. His brothers Clifford, Percy and Evans also played in both matches.

Career in Malaya
In 1913, he was appointed Attorney General of the Straits Settlements and served in that position until 1919, when he was appointed Chief Judicial Commissioner (Chief Justice) of the Federated Malay States. He was appointed Chief Justice of the Straits Settlement in November 1920, but died before he could take up the post.

Goodman was knighted in the 1920 New Year Honours.

Death
Goodman died in January 1921 in Bath, England.  He was buried in the Abbey Cemetery.  His coffin was placed in the grave of his wife, Gertrude, who had died a few weeks previously. She was the daughter of the artist Edward John Cobbett.

Goodman Road
Goodman Road in Singapore is named after Goodman.

Footnotes

References
Obituary, The Times, 22 January 1921

1862 births
1921 deaths
Alumni of University College London
Barbadian lawyers
Barbados cricketers
Members of the Middle Temple
Federated Malay States judges
Knights Bachelor
Barbadian Queen's Counsel
Members of the House of Assembly of Barbados
Attorneys-General of the Colony of Barbados
Solicitors General of Barbados
20th-century Barbadian lawyers
19th-century Barbadian lawyers
People educated at Harrison College (Barbados)
Barbadian cricketers